Jordan Matyas (née Gray) (born July 2, 1993) is an American rugby union player. She was named in the Eagles 2017 Women's Rugby World Cup squad.

Matyas attended Brigham Young University where she majored in Exercise Science.

In 2022, Matyas was named in the Eagles squad for the Pacific Four Series in New Zealand. She was later named in the Eagles squad to the 2021 Rugby World Cup in New Zealand.

References

External links
 Jordan Gray at USA Rugby
 

1993 births
Living people
American female rugby union players
United States women's international rugby union players
American female rugby sevens players
Brigham Young University alumni
Place of birth missing (living people)
Pan American Games silver medalists for the United States
Pan American Games medalists in rugby sevens
Rugby sevens players at the 2019 Pan American Games
Medalists at the 2019 Pan American Games